Simon Hunt, sometimes known as Pauline Pantsdown (born c. 1962), is an Australian satirist and Australian Senate candidate who parodied Pauline Hanson, a controversial member of federal parliament, in 1997 and 2016.
His birth name was Simon Hunt, but he legally changed his name through Births, Deaths & Marriages so that he would appear on the electoral ballot as "Pauline Pantsdown"; he later changed back to "Simon Hunt". He is the son of the late David Hunt, who was a Chief Judge at Common Law of the Supreme Court of New South Wales.

As Pantsdown, he is a drag queen whose taste in fashion parodies Hanson's, and is best known for the songs "Backdoor Man" and "I Don't Like It". The song "Backdoor Man" was a huge hit on the youth radio network Triple J after its release in 1997, being played almost hourly due to a massive number of requests, making it into the 1997 Hottest 100 list at number 5. However, less than a week after its release, Hanson obtained a court injunction against the song, claiming it was defamatory. In September 2004, after Hanson launched a campaign for the Australian Senate, the ABC was reported to be planning a challenge to the injunction. However, after public criticism from Hanson, the ABC backed down.

Early life and activism
Born in Sydney, Hunt began playing in bands when he was 12 years old.

Hunt became influenced by arts-activism work around the world as a young adult, particularly the group ACT UP.

Prior to parodying Hanson, Hunt had successfully lobbied the Office of Film and Literature Classification to remove homosexuality from its list of "adult themes", and produced a parody track collage of Fred Nile's voice. As a gay man, Hunt reflected that homosexuality was not legalized in New South Wales until he was 22; until that point, the prison sentence for consensual homosexual sex was longer than it was hetereosexual rape.

Hunt is currently a head lecturer at the University of New South Wales.

Homebake appearance
The resulting controversy resulted in Pauline Pantsdown making an appearance at the 1998 Homebake live music festival, complete with apparently gay half-naked Asian dancers. He was booed and pelted with objects and later claimed "Homophobia is alive and well in Sydney".

Songs
 "Backdoor Man" was originally conceived of as a lip-synch performance by Hunt for performance at a dance party. Another organiser of the party gave a recording of the song to the ABC to promote the dance party, and as a result, "Backdoor Man" became the most-requested song on Triple J over a period of 11 days. "Backdoor Man" consists of a series of samples of Hanson's speeches stuck together to form sentences such as "I'm a backdoor man. I'm homosexual. I'm very proud of it", and "I'm a backdoor man for the Ku Klux Klan with very horrendous plans. I'm a very caring potato", parodying Hanson's conservative politics. Hanson vehemently condemned the track, claiming that the song portrayed her as a prostitute and a transsexual.

 After the injunction over "Backdoor Man", Pantsdown released the follow-up single "I Don't Like It" in response. Once again the song used segments of Hanson's voice to parody her, this time with equally ridiculous but less personal lyrics such as "Why can't my blood be coloured white? I should talk to some medical doctors; coloured blood is just not right". Once again the song was a hit on Triple J and peaked in the ARIA Charts at number 10 during the 1998 federal election campaign. "I Don't Like It" was nominated for Best Comedy Release at the 1999 ARIA Awards.
 In 2004, on the Rock Against Howard compilation, Hunt released the song "I'm Sorry" under the pseudonym Little Johnny, which had appeared as a download on his website earlier in 2000 with a video. This song used the same techniques to parody John Howard's refusal to apologise to the Aboriginal people of Australia over the Stolen Generations.

Senate run
Hunt changed his name by deed poll so that he would appear on the electoral ballot for the 1998 senate elections as "Pauline Pantsdown"; he later changed back to "Simon Hunt". On the night of the federal election, Pantsdown performed at the Mardi Gras Sleaze Ball, and a Pauline Hanson Mardi Gras float was exploded.

2010s
Pantsdown performed a remixed version of "I Don't Like It" at the 2011 Sydney Gay & Lesbian Mardi Gras Party during Bob Downe's 'Retro-Gras' DJ set just days before Hanson announced her candidacy in the 2011 NSW state election. Pantsdown also performed a remixed version of "I Don't Like It" on Channel Seven's The Morning Show on 22 May 2012. Nearing the end of the performance, Hunt undid a rainbow-coloured button-up shirt and revealed a T-shirt with the slogan "ABBOTT is INSIDE me" written on it, with a caricature of Tony Abbott's head beneath it. In an interview following his performance, he claimed that he was partly inspired by the "hurt and pain" that, in particular, the communities Hanson targeted at the time felt, and "wanted to give them an opportunity to laugh back". Kylie Gillies also noted that Hunt now lectures at a university (Media Arts, at the University of New South Wales College of Fine Arts, or COFA).

Hunt also campaigned against opera singer Tamar Iveri, who was released from a performance of Othello after making homophobic comments on social media. After Hanson won a place in the senate in 2016, Hunt considered a return as Pantsdown.In the same year, in a televised clip, Hanson referred to Hunt as "What a joke...he was an absolute idiot ratbag".

Hunt maintains a Facebook page as Pauline Pantsdown. In 2016, he was campaigning against the same-sex marriage plebiscite and the Australian Christian Lobby.

Hunt explained, "I think that stopping the plebiscite has been incredibly important in, at the very least, shutting down funding for those sorts of campaigns. It would have been a really dark stain on our history if we had funded a ‘no’ campaign for this issue, because it wouldn’t have been about marriage equality at all."

Nevertheless, the plebiscite went ahead, and the legality of same-sex marriage was ratified with a 61.6% vote in the affirmative.

During the Australian Marriage Law Postal Survey, Pantsdown ran a parody Twitter account spoofing the Coalition for Marriage.

Awards and nominations

ARIA Music Awards
The ARIA Music Awards are a set of annual ceremonies presented by Australian Recording Industry Association (ARIA), which recognise excellence, innovation, and achievement across all genres of the music of Australia. They commenced in 1987. 

! 
|-
| rowspan="2"| 1999
| rowspan="2"| "I Don't Like It"
| ARIA Award for Best Independent Release
| 
| 
|-
| ARIA Award for Best Comedy Release
| 
|

References

External links
"Backdoor Man" MP3
ABC television news story on the "Backdoor Man" lawsuit – contains video footage of Ms Hanson and Ms Pantsdown outside the Supreme Court of Queensland

Profile at UNSW

Australian drag queens
Australian male singers
Australian musicians
Living people
Pauline Hanson
Year of birth missing (living people)